Emrah Eren (born  13 November 1978) is a Turkish retired footballer.

Emrah has played over 250 matches at Turkish Super League and was a Turkey U21 internationals.

Career
Emrah began his career at Gaziosmanpaşa in his teenage years, playing on the right side of defence and midfield. He became professional in İstanbulspor in 1995. He soon found himself at Süper Lig team Adanaspor, and immediately made his mark despite his youth. His talent earned him a place in the Turkish under-21 team, first at 1997 Mediterranean Games where he continued to impress the scouts from many teams. Displaying pace, power, technique and hard work it was obvious that he would soon join a big team.

In the summer of 1999, he joined Galatasaray. His time there was brief, as he failed to earn much playing time. He was loaned out to Istanbulspor for a while but found that his experience on his return to Galatasaray would be the same as he had been through before. At the beginning of the 2002 season he joined league strugglers Kocaelispor. Here he found regular playing time and refound his form and began to show signs of fulfilling his promise that he had displayed in his younger years. His efficient defending combined with runs into the opposition half made him one of the stars of the team. Kocaelispor were relegated from the Superlig. Emrah left to join the Black Sea club Trabzonspor.

At Trabzonspor, Emrah has established himself as one of the best defenders in Turkish football. He has fulfilled much of the potential that he showed in his youth. He is a fan favourite due to his modesty and hard work in the team. In July 2005 he extended his contract with the team for a further three years, to 2008.

In January 2006, he joined Malatyaspor.

Emrah Eren is married with one child.

In June 2010, Emrah Eren signed a 1 year contract with Konyaspor.

Honours
Galatasaray
 Süper Lig: 1999–2000
 Turkish Cup: 1999–2000
 UEFA Cup: 1999–2000

Trabzonspor
 Turkish Cup: 2003–04

Akhisar Belediyespor
 TFF First League: 2011–12

References

Turkish footballers
Turkey under-21 international footballers
İstanbulspor footballers
Kartalspor footballers
Adanaspor footballers
Galatasaray S.K. footballers
Gaziantepspor footballers
Kocaelispor footballers
Trabzonspor footballers
Malatyaspor footballers
Çaykur Rizespor footballers
Giresunspor footballers
Konyaspor footballers
Denizlispor footballers
Akhisarspor footballers
Süper Lig players
Association football defenders
Footballers from Istanbul
1978 births
Living people
Mediterranean Games silver medalists for Turkey
Competitors at the 1997 Mediterranean Games
Mediterranean Games medalists in football
20th-century Turkish people